Michael Francis Burbidge (born June 16, 1957) is an American prelate of the Catholic Church who has been the bishop of the Diocese of Arlington in Virginia since 2016. He previously served as an auxiliary bishop of the Archdiocese of Philadelphia in Pennsylvania from 2002 to 2006 and as  bishop of the Diocese of Raleigh in North Carolina from 2006 to 2016.

Biography

Early life and education
Michael Burbidge was born on June 16, 1957, in Philadelphia, Pennsylvania, to Francis and Shirley (Lilley) Burbidge. He has a brother, Francis Burbidge. Upon being confirmed, Burbidge chose Francis as his confirmation name. As a teenager, he worked at a Sears department store.

Burbidge graduated from Cardinal O'Hara High School in Springfield, Pennsylvania, in 1975, and then entered St. Charles Borromeo Seminary in Wynnewood, Pennsylvania.  He obtained a philosophy degree and a Master of Theology degree from St. Charles. He also holds a Master of Education degree in Educational Administration from Villanova University in Villanova, Pennsylvania, and a Doctor of Education degree from Immaculata University in East Whiteland Township, Pennsylvania.

Ordination and ministry
Burbidge was ordained to the priesthood by Cardinal John Krol for the Archdiocese of Philadelphia on May 19, 1984. After his ordination, Burbidge served as associate pastor at St. Bernard's Parish in Philadelphia until 1986. He also taught at Cardinal O'Hara High School in Springfield, Pennsylvania, from 1986 to 1990.

From 1990 to 1991, Burbidge served on the faculty of Archbishop Wood High School in Warminster, Pennsylvania, then became dean of students at St. Charles Seminary in 1991. He served as priest secretary to Cardinal Anthony Bevilacqua from 1992 to 1999, and was raised by the Vatican to the rank of honorary prelate of his holiness in 1998. In 1999, Burbidge was named rector of St. Charles Seminary.

Auxiliary Bishop of Philadelphia
On June 21, 2002, Burbidge was appointed an auxiliary bishop of the Archdiocese of Philadelphia and titular bishop of Cluain Iraird by Pope John Paul II. He received his episcopal consecration on  September 5, 2002, from Cardinal Bevilacqua, with Bishop Edward Cullen and Robert Maginnis serving as co-consecrators.

As an auxiliary bishop, Burbidge worked in the archdiocesan Office Center to assist the archbishop with administrative duties, including overseeing the office of the vicar for clergy, the Office of Communications, and The Catholic Standard & Times. He also served as a regional bishop.

Bishop of Raleigh

Burbidge was named bishop of the Diocese of Raleigh by Pope Benedict XVI on June 8, 2006. Burbidge was installed on August 4, 2006, at Raleigh's Sacred Heart Cathedral. Burbidge announced the building of a new cathedral for the Diocese of Raleigh, to be named the Cathedral of the Holy Name of Jesus. Building preparations began in 2013. Groundbreaking for the new cathedral occurred in 2014, and it was completed in 2017.

After the tornado outbreak of April 2011, in which 24 people were killed in North Carolina and other states, Burbidge urged Catholics to include victims and survivors in their Holy Week prayers. He directed the Diocese of Raleigh's ninety-five parishes and mission churches to hold a special collection for a disaster relief fund to be used to help survivors.

In 2012, Burbidge voiced his support for North Carolina Amendment 1 and criticized U.S. President Barack Obama's opposition to it.  Amendment 1 defined civil marriage as between one man and one woman. Opponents argued that Amendment 1 discriminated against LGBTQ people; Burbidge argued that it was not discriminatory. He received criticism for supporting the legislation. Amendment 1 passed, but was declared unconstitutional in US Federal Court on October 10, 2014.

In 2013, Burbidge indicated his support for the Moral Mondays protests in North Carolina.  It was a movement started by religious progressives encouraging civil disobedience and arguing for reforms to North Carolina laws regarding the environment, racial justice, gender equality, social programs, and education. Burbidge signed A Joint Statement by Episcopal, Lutheran, Presbyterian, Roman Catholic and United Methodist Leaders in North Carolina, but did not permit Catholic priests to join the protests.

On June 26, 2015, the United States Supreme Court ruled in favor of same-sex marriage in the Obergefell v. Hodges case legalizing same-sex marriage in the United States. Burbidge responded to the ruling with an official statement saying, "the true definition of marriage cannot be redefined by courts" and reiterated the Catholic Church's official teachings on marriage. He ended his statement saying that "we are to treat and engage one another in mutual and lasting respect."

On May 6, 2016, at a media luncheon, Burbidge openly criticized the controversial North Carolina Public Facilities Privacy & Security Act, a law which requires individuals to only use restrooms that correspond to the sex on their birth certificates and was seen as discriminatory against members of the LGBTQ community. Burbidge proposed that "...another remedy to the unfortunate situation created by the Charlotte Ordinance and HB2 should be considered..." and hoped that any legislative solution would "defend human dignity; avoid any form of bigotry; respect religious liberty and the convictions of religious institutions; work for the common good; and be discussed in a peaceful and respectful manner."

On November 29, 2016, Burbidge celebrated his last public Mass as bishop of Raleigh at St. Michael the Archangel Church in Cary, North Carolina, before leaving to become bishop of Arlington.

Sexual abuse in the Diocese of Raleigh 

In March 2007, a group of protesters, some alleged victims of clerical sexual abuse, stood outside the offices for the Diocese of Raleigh, claiming that Burbidge refused to meet with them. Diocese spokesman Frank Morock denied those claims, stating that the diocese "has always been very open to any victim who has stepped forward."

In July 2015 a three-judge panel in North Carolina ruled to allow a lawsuit to advance against the Diocese of Raleigh over an allegation of child sexual abuse by a priest. The North Carolina Court of Appeals rejected arguments made by lawyers representing Burbidge that allowing the lawsuit to advance into trial would violate the constitutional separation of church and state. The case involved allegations of sexual abuse of a sixteen-year-old boy by Edgar Sepulveda, a Catholic priest at the Santa Teresa del Niño Jesús Mission in Beulaville, North Carolina. Sepulveda denied the accusations. Sepulveda had been arrested in 2010 and charged with second-degree sexual offense and sexual battery but the charges were dropped by Brunswick County prosecutors citing a lack of evidence. Burbidge put Sepulveda on administrative leave, prohibiting him from visiting any parish or Catholic school, and removed him from residence on church grounds. The lawsuit claimed that Burbidge was negligent and inflicted further emotional distress on the victim by refusing to order Sepulveda to undergo testing for sexually transmitted diseases and then share results with the victim's family. Burbidge's lawyers denied that church officials had any knowledge of Sepulveda's alleged actions.

In 2013 Survivors Network of those Abused by Priests criticized Burbidge for not warning families in the diocese about Raymond P. Melville, a former Catholic priest accused of sexual abuse in Maine and in Maryland who had moved to North Carolina.

Bishop of Arlington
Burbidge was appointed as the fourth bishop of the Diocese of Arlington by Pope Francis on October 3, 2016, replacing retiring Bishop Paul Loverde. Burbidge was installed on December 6, 2016, at the Cathedral of St. Thomas More in Arlington. The Mass was attended by over 1,200 Catholics, including Cardinal Justin Rigali, Cardinal Donald Wuerl, then-Cardinal Theodore McCarrick, Archbishop William E. Lori and Archbishop Christophe Pierre.

On October 4, 2016, the Survivors Network of those Abused by Priests criticized the Vatican's appointment of Burbidge to the Diocese of Arlington, claiming he has shown no leadership in the church's sex abuse crisis. Burbidge released a statement on October 6, 2016, in which he vowed to continue the diocese's outreach for victims of clerical sexual abuse and to personally reach out to victims. He continued on the outreach program, holding Masses for healing for victims of abuse.

In January 2017, Burbidge spoke out against U.S. President Donald Trump's Executive Order 13769, which barred refugees and immigrants from Libya, Sudan, Somalia, Syria, Iran, Iraq, and Yemen from entering the United States for 90 days, limited the number of refugee arrivals to the United States to 50,000 for 2017, suspended the United States Refugee Admissions Program for 120 days, and barred Refugees of the Syrian Civil War from entering the United States indefinitely. Burbidge went on to encourage American Catholics to contact their elected officials and voice their opposition to the new policy and to pray for immigration reform, stating that the Diocese of Arlington and other Catholic communities would continue to be hospitable to refugees.

On July 26, 2017, Burbidge returned to the Diocese of Raleigh to celebrate Mass with his successor in Raleigh, Bishop Luis Zarama, and to give the homily at the dedication of the Cathedral of the Holy Name of Jesus.

Following the Unite the Right rally that took place August 11 and 12, 2017, in Charlottesville, Virginia to protest the removal of the Robert E. Lee Monument, Burbidge spoke out calling the events that ensued "saddening and disheartening." He went on to condemn violence, racism, bigotry, hatred and "self-proclaimed superiority", denouncing "any form of hatred as a sin."

On August 22, 2017, William Aitcheson, a priest in the diocese, admitted to being a member of the Ku Klux Klan while a college student in the 1970s.  Aitcheson also announced that he would temporarily step down from his post at St. Leo the Great Catholic Parish in Fairfax, Virginia. Burbidge released a statement referring to Aitcheson's past as "sad and deeply troubling" while hoping that his conversion of heart would inspire others.

In September 2017, Burbidge responded to Trump's decision to rescind Deferred Action for Childhood Arrivals (DACA) by calling on Catholics to keep all people protected by DACA, and all government officials, in their prayers. He referred to Trump's decision as "disheartening" and stated that the United States government has a responsibility to protect those who are in the United States under the protection of DACA.

On August 3, 2018, Burbidge expressed his anger and sadness regarding the allegations of sexual abuse by former Cardinal McCarrick.  He stated that bishops must be held accountable for their actions.

On February 13, 2019, Burbidge and Barry C. Knestout, bishop of the Diocese of Richmond, released a list of clergy that had credibly been accused of sexual abuse in their dioceses between 1974 and 2019. On August 12, 2021, Burbidge released a pastoral letter in which he explained the church's stance on transgenderism and criticized the use of preferred gender pronouns when addressing transgender people.

In January 2022, Burbidge issued regulations for the Diocese of Arlington regarding Pope Francis' motu propio Traditionis custodes. He permitted celebration of the extraordinary form of the Mass to continue in 21 parishes, but he suspended the celebration of any "new celebrations of the Sacraments" in the extraordinary form. This decision was made after the Vatican's responsa ad dubia was issued the previous month, which constituted a non-authoritative attempt to suppress the celebration of sacraments according to the ancient forms of the Rituale Romanum and the Pontificale Romanum.   In July 2022, a year following the publication of Traditionis custodes, he further restricted the extraordinary form in his diocese, allowing it only in eight parishes, and in five of those eight it may only be celebrated in a building other than the main church.In June 2022, Burbidge called upon U.S. President Joe Biden to publicly repent for his support of abortion.

U.S. Conference of Catholic Bishops 

He eventually became the chairman for the 2018–2021 term.

Burbidge was described in a 2022 Catholic News Agency article as a "seasoned communicator" and a "staunch defender of the right to life", citing, among other things, his banning of Nancy Pelosi (U.S. Speaker of the House) from communion for her pro-abortion stance. He serves as chairman for the remaining two years of Lori's term, which ends in 2024.

Personal life 
Burbidge was diagnosed with prostate cancer in 2018 and was treated through surgery on November 27, 2018.

Pastoral letters 
 Bishop's Letter to Congregation at Colgan's funeral (2017)
 Bishop Burbidge’s letter to parishioners at St. Leo Parish on Fr. Aitcheson (2018)
 A Letter to Parents from Bishop Burbidge for Catholic Schools Week 2018 (2018)
 Letter from Bishop Burbidge on the Novena for the Legal Protection for Human Life (2018)
 Letter to the Faithful from Bishop Burbidge regarding the Pennsylvania grand jury report and allegations of sexual abuse in the Church (2018)
 Being Citizens Faithful to the Lord (2018)
 Letter to the Faithful from Bishop Burbidge for World Day of the Poor 2018 (2018)
 Bishop Burbidge issues letter to St. Andrew the Apostle Church regarding Fr. Christopher Mould 2019)
 Letter to the Faithful from Bishop Burbidge for World Day of the Poor 2019 (2019)
 Letter to the Faithful from Bishop Burbidge regarding the #JustOneYes Campaign (2019)
 In Tongues All Can Hear: Communicating the Hope of Christ in Times of Trial (2020)
 Letter from Bishop Michael F. Burbidge on World Day Migrants and Refugees 2020 (2020)
 Letter from Most Reverend Michael F. Burbidge Bishop of Arlington on the World Day of the Poor (2020)
 Letter from Bishop Michael F Burbidge on Christmas 2020 (2020)
 Statement from Bishop Michael F. Burbidge for Catholic Schools Week 2021 (2021)
 A Letter from Bishop Michael F. Burbidge on Easter 2021 (2021)
  A Catechesis on the Human Person and Gender Ideology (2021)
 Our Sacred Duty (2021)
 Letter by Bishop Burbidge on XVI Ordinary General Assembly of the Synod of Bishops (2021)
 Letter by Bishop Burbidge on Christmas 2021 (2021)

See also

 Catholic Church hierarchy
 Catholic Church in the United States
 Historical list of the Catholic bishops of the United States
 List of Catholic bishops of the United States
 Lists of patriarchs, archbishops, and bishops

Notes

References

External links

 Roman Catholic Diocese of Arlington
 Roman Catholic Diocese of Raleigh
 Roman Catholic Archdiocese of Philadelphia

1957 births
Living people
21st-century Roman Catholic bishops in the United States
Clergy from Philadelphia
Educators from North Carolina
Immaculata University alumni
People from Raleigh, North Carolina
Roman Catholic bishops in North Carolina
Roman Catholic bishops in Virginia
Roman Catholic Diocese of Raleigh
St. Charles Borromeo Seminary alumni
St. Charles Borromeo Seminary faculty
Villanova University alumni